Emmanuel Savary (born January 6, 1998) is an American figure skater. He graduated from Glasgow High School in Glasgow, Delaware in June 2016 and his brother is former ice skater Joel Savary. He and Starr Andrews were the only two African Americans to take part in the 2020 U.S. Figure Skating Championships.

Programs

2006–present 
GP: Grand Prix; CS: Challenger Series; JGP: Junior Grand Prix

References

1998 births
Living people
American male single skaters
People from Hollywood, Florida